The Dubuque area is the general area encompassing Dubuque, Iowa. The official population of the Dubuque metro (Dubuque County) was 92,384 as of the 2005 population estimates. Although, if the unofficial counties are included, the area's population is near 190,000.

Geography 

The Dubuque area is in the Driftless Area. This area was un-affected by glaciers during the last major ice age. Hills, cliffs, and valleys dominate the region. In fact, Dubuque's hills are often compared to those of San Francisco. The Mississippi River separates Iowa from Wisconsin and Illinois, though the two states can be accessed by two bridges.

Growth 

The areas west of Dubuque have with-held major growth, expansion, and commercialization in the past two decades. With quick access to Dubuque via U.S. Route 20, towns like Asbury, Peosta, and Epworth have expanded.

Major towns 
Dubuque: Dubuque is the main town in the Dubuque metropolitan area. It is at the junction of four major highways and two major railroads. Its location along the river has formed the city into a major Midwestern hub. Downtown Dubuque sits below a cliff, while Central and Western Dubuque sit atop a plateau with many, many hills. Dubuque's healthcare system rivals that of other cities in the state, and the Dubuque School System was ranked in the top 50 in the nation. Dubuque was ranked 1st in the 100 best communities for young people, 15th in the best places for business ranking, 22nd in the nation, among any city for job growth.

Platteville: Platteville is the largest city in Grant County, and Southwest Wisconsin. University of Wisconsin–Platteville (UWP), is located there. 10,000 people call Platteville home. Walter Payton would visit buddies in Platteville and have a few drinks. Platteville is considered a micropolitan area.
Galena: Galena is Midwest-renowned for being a quaint mid-America town with boutiques and hundreds of shops along main street. Some of the shops include furniture shops, several candy shops, multiple bed and breakfasts, tens of bars, and many gift shops as well. The town sits along the Plum River which runs to Hanover, IL and beyond. The population of Galena ranges between 3,500 and 4,000, making it easily the largest city in Jo Daviess County, Illinois.
East Dubuque: East Dubuque is sometimes called the Illinois Bar Capital. The population is only around 2000, but you could find at least 50 bars surrounding and in East Dubuque. East Dubuque is often abbreviated "ED." Most East Dubuquans work in either Galena, or Dubuque.
Asbury: Asbury is a prime and vital suburb of the Dubuque area. Asbury has developed mass commercial districts along the Northwest Arterial, Highway 32 in Dubuque. It is likely that Asbury will continue to grow, and reach the 10,000 population mark in less than 15 years. There is a ski resort, Sundown Mountain, located two miles west of town.

Communities 

The area generally includes the towns of:

In Illinois:

In Wisconsin:

In Iowa

References 

Geography of Dubuque County, Iowa